The following is an incomplete list of festivals in Finland.

Festivals

 
Helsinki Festival
Helsinki Pride 
Baltic Circle Festival
Tampere Theatre Festival
ANTI – Contemporary Art Festival
Art Centre KulttuuriKauppila
Art Centre Salmela
IHME Contemporary Art Festival
Jyväskylä Arts Festival
Kesäkumi
Night of the Arts
Tampere Theatre Festival
Tangomarkkinat
Assembly (demo party)
Finnish Metal Expo
Flow Festival
Funky Elephant
Helsinki Burlesque Festival
Helsinki Comics Festival
Helsinki International Film Festival
Helsinki Samba Carnaval
IHME Contemporary Art Festival
Night Visions (film festival)
Summer Sound Festival
Tuska Open
World Village Festival 
Finnish Metal Expo 
Helsinki Book Fair 
Tampere Floral Festival 
Tangomarkkinat 
Kaustinen Folk Music Festival 
Animatricks  
Art Centre KulttuuriKauppila 
Art Centre Salmela 
World Village Festival

Film festivals in Finland

Animatricks 
Espoo Ciné International Film Festival 
Helsinki International Film Festival 
Midnight Sun Film Festival 
Night Visions (film festival) 
Oulu International Children's and Youth Film Festival 
Oulu Music Video Festival 
Tampere Film Festival 
Vinokino

Music festivals in Finland

 Flow Festival (Helsinki)
 Funky Elephant (Jyväskylä)

 Helsinki Samba Carnaval (Helsinki)

 Kaustinen Folk Music Festival (Kaustinen)
 Naantali Music Festival (Naantali)
 Organ Night & Aria Festival (Urkuyö)
 Rock Fest (Hyvinkää)
 Sommelo (Kuhmo)

 Summer Sound Festival (Lahti)

 Tuska Open (Helsinki)

External links

 

Finland
Finland
 
Festivals
Festivals
Festivals